The Theatre Royal, Brighton is a theatre in Brighton, England presenting a range of West End and touring musicals and plays, along with performances of opera and ballet.

History
In 1806 the Prince of Wales (later George IV) gave Royal Assent for the theatre to be built and it opened on 27 June 1807, with a performance of William Shakespeare's Hamlet. The theatre struggled until it was purchased in 1854 by actor Henry John Nye Chart, who engaged theatre architect Charles J. Phipps to begin a programme of expansion and redevelopment.

The theatre improved its reputation and finances, becoming a respected venue. When Henry John Nye Chart died in 1876 his wife, Ellen Elizabeth Nye Chart, took over and continued the success as one of the first female theatre managers. There is a statue to honour her in the Royal Circle bar.

The venue used to have a "gulp bar", a backstage bar where actors could get a drink, even mid-performance.

In 1920 the financial buoyancy of the Theatre enabled the directors to buy adjacent properties and make substantial improvements to the building. In 1923 the Theatre purchased the Colonnade Hotel, now the Colonnade bar and in 1927 the last major structural enlargement was made to the auditorium. In 1928 Walter C. Hackett's Other Men's Wives premiered at the theatre before transferring to the West End. Later premieres included The Ninth Man (1931), Frieda (1946), Young Wives' Tale (1949), Escapade (1952) and Not in the Book (1958).

In the mid and later 20th Century the Royal's stature and national reputation continued to grow. Ibsen, Rattigan, Coward and Orton plays opened as a try out date before a London West End run. The Redgrave Family, Laurence Olivier, John Gielgud, Charlton Heston, Marlene Dietrich, Margot Fonteyn, Rex Harrison, Judi Dench and Paul Scofield all performed there.

In 1984, London impresario David Land, bought the theatre and subsidised productions at the theatre out of his own pocket up to £400,000 a year.  Land and later his son, Brook, ran the theatre for a decade and a half revitalising the Royal with popular acts.

In 1999 the Theatre Royal was bought by the Ambassador Theatre Group and a full-scale modernisation commenced.

In 2007 the theatre celebrated its 200th anniversary with a visit from the Queen. The venue offers backstage tours, where the public can go behind the scenes at this grade II listed building.

In recent years, catering to a wider demographic, the Theatre Royal Brighton has chosen to offer an alternative to a Christmas pantomime, which it historically performed, replacing such shows with hits such as Spamalot (2011), The Rocky Horror Show (2012), and Priscilla Queen of the Desert (2013). It also regularly hosts performances during the city's annual Brighton Festival.

References

External links

 History of Brighton's Theatres Including the Theatre Royal
 Theatre Royal Brighton

Theatres in Brighton and Hove
Grade II listed buildings in Brighton and Hove
Clayton & Black buildings
Charles J. Phipps buildings